Sir Henry Seymour Baker  (1 September 1890 – 20 July 1968) was an English-born Australian politician.

Biography
He was born in Liverpool. He qualified with a Bachelor (1913) and Master (1915) of Law. He served in the First World War, where he was awarded the Distinguished Service Order. In 1928 he was elected to the Tasmanian House of Assembly as a Nationalist member for Franklin. From 1936 to 1945 he was Leader of the Opposition. He retired from the House in 1946 and was appointed a Companion of the Order of St Michael and St George. In 1948 he was elected to the Tasmanian Legislative Council as the independent member for Queenborough. He was elected President of the Council in 1959 and was created a Knight Commander of the Order of St Michael and St George in 1960. Baker died in 1968 in Hobart.

References

1890 births
1968 deaths
Nationalist Party of Australia members of the Parliament of Tasmania
Liberal Party of Australia members of the Parliament of Tasmania
Independent members of the Parliament of Tasmania
Members of the Tasmanian House of Assembly
Members of the Tasmanian Legislative Council
Presidents of the Tasmanian Legislative Council
Leaders of the Opposition in Tasmania
Australian Companions of the Distinguished Service Order
Australian Knights Commander of the Order of St Michael and St George
Australian politicians awarded knighthoods
Politicians from Liverpool
British emigrants to Australia
Australian military personnel of World War I
20th-century Australian politicians